My Vinyl Weighs a Ton is the debut studio album by American hip hop producer and DJ Peanut Butter Wolf. It was released in 1999 on his own record label, Stones Throw Records, in conjunction with Copasetik Records. It peaked at number 44 on the UK Independent Albums Chart. On the week of March 1, 1999, it reached number 1 on the KTUH Top 30 chart.

Critical reception
John Bush of AllMusic gave the album 4.5 stars out of 5, calling it "one of the grooviest, funkiest underground records of the '90s." He said, "My Vinyl Weighs a Ton boasts deep beats and choice samples, all of them working brilliantly together, and enough great cutting to keep each track raw and full of energy." On the issue of March 1, 1999, CMJ New Music Report listed it as one of the "Essential Releases of the Week".

In 2015, Fact placed it at number 58 on the "Best Indie Hip-Hop Records of All Time" list. In 2016, HotNewHipHop placed it at number 5 on the "Top 10 Compilation-Style Albums by Producers" list.

Track listing

Personnel
Credits adapted from liner notes.

 Peanut Butter Wolf – production, turntables
 Planet Asia – vocals (2, 16)
 Lootpack – vocals (3, 13), turntables (3, 13)
 DJ Babu – turntables (4)
 Rasco – vocals (6, 18)
 Zest – vocals (7, 23)
 Pablo – vocals (8)
 Dave Dub – vocals (10)
 Charizma – vocals (11)
 Kazi – vocals (13)
 A-Trak – turntables (14)
 Cut Chemist – turntables (14)
 DJ Hands – turntables (14)
 DJ Quest – turntables (14)
 DJ Total Eclipse – turntables (14)
 Z-Trip – turntables (14)
 J Rocc – turntables (14)
 Kid Koala – turntables (14)
 Rhettmatic – turntables (14)
 Rob Swift – turntables (14)
 Shortkut – turntables (14, 22)
 DJ Design – production (19), turntables (19)
 Capt. Funkaho – vocals (20)
 Persevere – vocals (21)
 Vin Roc – turntables (21)
 Grand the Vis – vocals (22)

Charts

References

External links
 

1999 debut albums
Peanut Butter Wolf albums
Stones Throw Records albums